Pandit Siyaram Tiwari (10 March 1919 – 1998) was an Indian classical singer and leading exponent of Dhrupad-genre of Hindustani classical music. He belonged to the Darbhanga gharana and was based in Patna. Though Darbhaga gharam is known for its laykari (the play on laya or tempo, using devices such as syncopation) techniques, he was the first exponent of the gharana to promote fast-paced laykari in Dhrupad, which developed in the second half of 20th-century.

In 1971, he was awarded the Padma Shri by Government of India. Thereafter in 1984, he was awarded the Sangeet Natak Akademi Fellowship the highest honour conferred by the Sangeet Natak Akademi, India's National Academy of Music, Dance & Drama.

He is the Maternal Grandfather of Indian Television Actress Neha Sargam. She is an talented singer herself and has been lauded for her acting and singing in popular musical play Mughal é Azam.

Early life and background
Born in 1919 in Darbhanga, Bihar, he received his training in Dhrupad from his maternal grandfather, of Dharbhanga gharana. Subsequently, his learnt Khyal, Thumri and Bhajan genre from his father Baldev Tiwari.

Career
His singing, gayaki was known for Swara, Meend, Gamak and Laykari. Besides improvisation of  complicated Chhand, which allowed him to move from one rhythm pattern to another. He also performed in other genres such as Khyal, Thumri, Tappa and bhajan.

He was a leading performer at All India Radio, Patna.

Awards: Padma Shri in 1971, gold medal. From Pres.  Dr.Rajendra Prasad 1955, Bihar ratna 1989, tansen award and many other awards by numerous  music organisations of India and abroad. performed in concerts all over India, Europe, etc.

Tiwari died in 1998.

References

External links

1919 births
1998 deaths
20th-century Indian male classical singers
Hindustani singers
Recipients of the Padma Shri in arts
Recipients of the Sangeet Natak Akademi Fellowship
Musicians from Patna
Singers from Bihar